Yautepec District is located in the east of the Sierra Sur Region of the State of Oaxaca, Mexico.

Environment

The district lies in the eastern end of the Sierra Madre del Sur and is mountainous, with an area of 4,772 square kilometers.
The temperature is generally temperate, warmer in the lower areas and cooler higher up, with prevalent winds from the north.
Trees include mahogany, cedar, oak, guanacaste and pine. Mango, tamarind, plum, sapodilla, lemon, avocado and papaya fruits are grown. Wild fauna include wild boar, ocelots, snakes, mountain lion, coyotes and foxes.

People

The total population is 31,688. 
Indigenous people include Zapotec, Mixe and Chontal.
Economic activities include agriculture, growing maize, sorghum, peanuts, beans, coffee and various fruits. Some cattle is raised, and villagers often raise goats, sheep, and pigs. Hunting and fishing are typically practiced on a small scale for personal consumption. There is some logging activity, and the wild maguey is harvested for its juice.

Municipalities

The district includes the following municipalities, with population statistics as of 2005:

References

Districts of Oaxaca
Sierra Sur de Oaxaca